The Great American Broadcast is a 1941 comedy film directed by Archie Mayo. It stars Jack Oakie, Alice Faye and John Payne.

Plot
Impoverished roommates Rix Martin and Chuck Hadley have dreams of being the first to operate a coast-to-coast
radio broadcast. They invest what little profit their small station makes into advanced equipment and finally get their wish when they bootleg the Jack Dempsey--Jess Willard 1919 heavyweight title fight from ringside.

Meanwhile, the  station's band singer is surrounded by suitors---Payne, Oakie, and Chadwick, without
whose money the station could not operate.

Cast
Alice Faye as Vicki Adams
John Payne as Rix Martin
Jack Oakie as Chuck Hadley
Cesar Romero as Bruce Chadwick
James Newill as Great American Broadcast Lead Singer
The Ink Spots as themselves: Bill Kenny, Deek Watson, Charlie Fuqua, and Orville "Hoppy" Jones
Bill Kenny as Song Specialty [member of The Ink Spots]
Orville "Hoppy" Jones as Song Specialty [member of The Ink Spots]
Charlie Fuqua as Song Specialty [member of The Ink Spots]
Deek Watson as Song Specialty [member of The Ink Spots]
The Nicholas Brothers as themselves: [Fayard and Harold Nicholas]
Fayard Nicholas as Railroad Station Dance Specialty [member of The Nicholas Brothers]
Harold Nicholas as Railroad Station Dance Specialty [member of The Nicholas Brothers]
The Wiere Brothers as themselves [Harry Wiere, Herbert Wiere & Sylvester Wiere]
Harry Wiere as Chapman's Cheerful Chappies & The Stradivarians [member of The Wiere Brothers]
Herbert Wiere as Chapman's Cheerful Chappies & The Stradivarians [member of The Wiere Brothers]
Sylvester Wiere as Chapman's Cheerful Chappies & The Stradivarians [member of The Wiere Brothers]
Mary Beth Hughes as Secretary
Eula Morgan as Madame Rinaldi
William Pawley as Foreman
Lucien Littlefield as Justice of the Peace
Edward Conrad as Conductor
Gary Breckner as Announcer
M.J. Frankovich [billed as Mike Frankovich] as Announcer
Frank Orth as Counter Man
Eddie Acuff as Jimmy
Mildred Gover as Jennie
Syd Saylor as Brakeman

Cameo appearances by:

Milton Berle as Radio Announcer [scenes deleted]
Jack Benny as Self [uncredited appearance in Opening Montage, taken from archive footage]
Eddie Cantor as Self [uncredited appearance in Opening Montage, taken from archive footage]
Kate Smith as Self [uncredited appearance in Opening Montage, taken from archive footage]
Rudy Vallee as Self [uncredited appearance in Opening Montage, taken from archive footage]
Paul Whiteman as Self [uncredited appearance in Opening Montage, taken from archive footage]
Walter Winchell as Self [uncredited appearance in Opening Montage, taken from archive footage]

References

External links
 
 
 

1941 films
1941 musical comedy films
1941 romantic comedy films
American musical comedy films
American romantic comedy films
American romantic musical films
Films directed by Archie Mayo
20th Century Fox films
Films produced by Darryl F. Zanuck
1940s romantic musical films
American black-and-white films
1940s American films